Goniodoma sinica is a moth of the family Coleophoridae. It is found in China.

References

Coleophoridae
Moths described in 2002